Okill Massey Learmonth, VC, MC (20 February 1894 – 19 August 1917), was a Canadian soldier. Learmonth was a recipient of the Victoria Cross, the highest and most prestigious award for gallantry in the face of the enemy that can be awarded to Commonwealth forces. Learmonth served in the Canadian Expeditionary Force during World War I, and was awarded his medal posthumously for actions at the Battle of Hill 70.

Details

Learmonth was 23 years old, and an acting Major in the 2nd (Eastern Ontario) Battalion, Canadian Expeditionary Force, during the First World War when the following deed took place for which he was awarded the VC.

On 18 August 1917 east of Loos, France, during a determined counter-attack on our new positions, Major Learmonth, when his company was momentarily surprised, instantly charged and personally disposed of the attackers. Later, although under intense barrage fire and mortally wounded, he stood on the parapet of the trench, bombing the enemy and on several occasions he actually caught bombs thrown at him and threw them back. When unable to carry on the fight, he still refused to be evacuated and continued giving instructions and invaluable advice, finally handing over all his duties before he was moved to hospital where he died.

Further information
Born in Quebec City, Canada, he was elected a member of the Literary and Historical Society of Quebec in March 1914. He is buried at Noeux-les-Mines Communal Cemetery, France, 2 miles northwest of Lens (plot 11, row K, grave 9). Learmonth Street in Quebec City, Canada is named after him. Major Learmonth's VC is apparently held by the Governor General's Foot Guards' museum on Queen Elizabeth Drive in Ottawa, Ontario.

References

External links 
 Okill Massey Learmonth's digitized service file
 Biography at the Dictionary of Canadian Biography Online
 Biography of Okill Massey Learmonth on DND's Directorate of History and Heritage
 Okill Massey Learmonth biography on the Canadian Virtual War Memorial
 
 Legion Magazine article on Okill Learmonth

Canadian recipients of the Military Cross
Canadian World War I recipients of the Victoria Cross
1894 births
1917 deaths
Canadian Expeditionary Force officers
Canadian military personnel from Quebec
People from Quebec City
Canadian military personnel killed in World War I
Governor General's Foot Guards